No. 156 Squadron RAF was a Royal Air Force Squadron that was active as a bomber unit in World War II.

History

Formation and World War I
No. 156 Squadron Royal Air Force was first formed on 12 October 1918 at RAF Wyton and equipped with DH 9 aircraft, but was disbanded on 9 December 1918 without becoming operational.

Reformation in World War II

The squadron reformed in February 1942 from the home echelon of 40 Squadron at RAF Alconbury, in the Huntingdonshire area of Cambridgeshire, as part of No. 3 Group RAF and was equipped with Wellingtons. In August 1942 it joined No. 8 Group RAF it became one of the original pathfinder squadrons, converting to Lancasters in January 1943. It continued in the pathfinder role until the end of the war, being based at RAF Warboys, RAF Upwood and finally its original founding base, RAF Wyton, where it disbanded on 25 September 1945. The Jamaican airman Billy Strachan flew 30 operations as an air gunner with the squadron.

Notable pilots
 Gordon Cochrane
 Peter Isaacson
 Billy Strachan
 Frank Watkins
 Pilot Officer Colin Kirkus - lost without trace 13/14 September 1942 on a mission to Bremen in Vickers Wellington BJ879.

Memorials

There is a memorial to the crash of Avro Lancaster ED840, 156 Squadron, which crashed in the town in Lier, Belgium on 17 June 1943.  It was on a mission to Cologne when it was shot down by anti-aircraft fire. In the Netherlands is a memorial for the Avro Lancaster ND559 crew. The crew was on 22 May 1944, on a mission to Duisburg. On the way back the plane was shot down above Molenaarsgraaf and Brandwijk.

Aircraft operated

Squadron bases

Commanding officers

References

Notes

Bibliography

 Bowyer, Michael J.F. and John D.R. Rawlings. Squadron Codes, 1937-56. Cambridge, UK: Patrick Stephens Ltd., 1979. .
 Flintham, Vic and Andrew Thomas. Combat Codes: A full explanation and listing of British, Commonwealth and Allied air force unit codes since 1938. Shrewsbury, Shropshire, UK: Airlife Publishing Ltd., 2003. .
 Halley, James J. The Squadrons of the Royal Air Force & Commonwealth, 1918-88. Tonbridge, Kent, UK: Air-Britain (Historians) Ltd., 1988. .
 Jefford, C.G. RAF Squadrons, a Comprehensive Record of the Movement and Equipment of all RAF Squadrons and their Antecedents since 1912. Shrewsbury, Shropshire, UK: Airlife Publishing, 2001. .
 Moyes, Philip J.R. Bomber Squadrons of the RAF and their Aircraft. London: Macdonald and Jane's (Publishers) Ltd., 1976. .
 Wadsworth, Michael P. They Led the Way: the Story of Pathfinder Squadron 156. Beverley: Highgate Publications Ltd., 1992. .

External links

 156 Squadron site
 History of No.'s 156–160 Squadrons at RAF Web
 156 Squadron history on the official RAF website

156
Military units and formations established in 1918
1918 establishments in England